

The Grahame-White Type XI (also known as the "Naval and Military Biplane") was an early aircraft built in the United Kingdom and marketed as being particularly well-suited to military applications. It was a two-bay biplane of pod-and-boom configuration with unstaggered wings of slightly unequal span. The pilot and an observer sat in tandem, open cockpits in a streamlined nacelle, with the engine mounted pusher-fashion behind them. Unusually for an aircraft of this period, the propeller was not driven directly by the engine, but rather, via a sprocket and chain system that geared it down in the ratio of 14/23. The undercarriage was of the fixed, tailskid type but was designed to be easily exchanged for pontoons. Construction throughout was fabric-covered wood, with the exception of a neat aluminium cowling for the engine and transmission. A sample was exhibited at the Olympia Aero Show in 1914.

Specifications

References
 
 
 

1910s British military utility aircraft
Grahame-White aircraft
Rotary-engined aircraft
Biplanes